Emil Svoboda (16 August 1928 – 11 August 2019) was a Czech footballer. He played in five matches for the Czechoslovakia national football team from 1955 to 1957.

References

External links
 

1928 births
2019 deaths
Czech footballers
Czechoslovakia international footballers
Place of birth missing
Association footballers not categorized by position
FC Písek players
AC Sparta Prague players
FC Viktoria Plzeň players
Slávia Bratislava VŠ players
Sportspeople from Písek